Anders Näsström (born 30 April 1964) is a Swedish luger. He competed in the men's singles event at the 1988 Winter Olympics.

References

External links
 

1964 births
Living people
Swedish male lugers
Olympic lugers of Sweden
Lugers at the 1988 Winter Olympics
Sportspeople from Stockholm